Álvaro Brechner (born April 9, 1976 in Montevideo, Uruguay) is a Spanish-Uruguayan film director, screenwriter and producer that lives in Madrid.

He is best known for writing and directing the feature films, Bad Day to Go Fishing (Mal Día Para Pescar), Mr. Kaplan and A Twelve-Year Night (La Noche de 12 Años).

He won a Goya Award from  the Academy Awards of Spain, and his films have invited to the most prestigious film festival as Cannes Film Festival and Venice Film Festival. All his three  films have been chosen as Uruguay's official selection for the Academy Award for Best Foreign Language Film.

Recently Variety magazine considers Brechner as one of the leading South American screen talents to emerge in the last decade,

With only 46, received the "Faro de honor" award for his career at the Santander Festival.

Biography
He attended the Catholic University of Uruguay where he obtained a degree in Media Studies.

In 1999 he earned a master's degree in creative documentary at the Universidad Autonoma de Barcelona, Spain.

He directed and produced several documentaries and the 35mm short films: "The Nine Mile Walk" (based on a short story by the American writer Harry Kemelman), "Sofia" and "Second Anniversary".

In 2009, his feature film debut Bad Day to Go Fishing premiered at the International Critics' Week of the Cannes Film Festival. It was the Uruguayan candidate for the Academy Award for Best Foreign Language Film. The film went on to win several international awards and has been screened in many  film festivals such as the 26th Warsaw International Film Festival (Best Film Free Spirit Comp.), Montreal World Film Festival, Los Angeles Latino International Film Festival (Best Film Opera Prima), Mar del Plata Film Festival (Best Actor), Moscow International Film Festival, Shanghai International Film Festival, Austin (Best Film & Audience Award), Brooklyn (Best Director), Sofia International Film Festival (Best Film Fipresci), São Paulo, Busan International Film Festival and Palm Springs International Film Festival.

The film won 10 Uruguay Fipresci Critics Awards, including Best Film, Best International Film Debut, Best Director, Best Screenplay and Best Actor and was nominated for Best Film, Best Screenplay and Best Actor by the Spanish Critics (CEC).

He directed Mr. Kaplan in 2014.
The project was developed through TorinoFilmLab' Script&Pitch programme in 2010 and Framework in 2011. He won a €100.000 Production Award and a €30.000 Audience Award.

The film was selected by dozens of Ffstivals including BFI London Film Festival, Mar del Plata Film Festival, Busan International Film Festival, Havana Film Festival, Palm Springs International Film Festival, Fribourg and Huelva Film Festival.

It was the Uruguayan candidate for the Academy Award for Best Foreign Language Film, and was nominated for Best Iberoamerican Film for the Goya Awards of the Spanish Film Academy, the Ariel Award of the Mexican Academy of Film, and received 7 nominations at the 2nd Platino Awards, including Best Film of the year, Best Director, Best Screenplay, Best Photography, Best Editing, Best Sound and Best Art Direction.

In 2014 Brechner was highlighted by Variety as one of the Up Next 10, a list of the most interesting directors and producers emerging from Latin America.

In 2017 he was one of several Latin American directors interviewed in A Companion to Latin American Cinema, which also included Alejandro González Iñárritu, Pablo Larraín, Diego Luna and Martín Rejtman.

Brechner's third film A Twelve-Year Night premiered as an Official Selection at the 75th Venice International Film Festival and San Sebastian Film Festival. It was the Uruguayan candidate for the Academy Award for Best Foreign Language Film in 2019 and for Best Adapted Screenplay at Spain's Goya Awards.

A Twelve-Year Night was awarded at the co-production markets of Berlin International Film Festival and San Sebastián International Film Festival.

Selected filmography
 Bad Day to Go Fishing (2009)
 Mr. Kaplan (2014)
 A Twelve-Year Night (2018)

References

External links

Bad Day to go Fishing Official Website
Álvaro Brechner – Cineuropa

Living people
1976 births
Uruguayan people of Polish-Jewish descent
Catholic University of Uruguay alumni
Uruguayan film directors
Uruguayan film producers
People from Montevideo
Silver Condor Award for Best Ibero-American Film winners